Cocles, Cocle, or Coclé may refer to:

People 
 Horatius Cocles, a hero in the historical legends of ancient Rome
 Bartolomeo della Rocca (1467–1504), called Cocles, Italian scholar

Places 
 Hispanicized spelling of Kéköldi, a Costa Rican indigenous community
 Coclé Province, Panama
 Coclé, Coclé, a corregimiento (subdistrict)

Animals 
 Cocle salamander (Bolitoglossa schizodactyla)

See also 
 Coclé del Norte, Panama
 Cocle del Norte River, Panama
 Cocle del Sur River, Panama
 Cochlea, part of the inner ear
 Cockle (disambiguation)
 Kokle, a Latvian string instrument